House at Caulfield, is a family home situated at 450 Dandenong Road in Caulfield North, Melbourne, Victoria, Australia, designed by Anatol Kagan in 1956 for Polish-Jewish emigre Leo Lind and his wife Dorothy.  Born in Russian on October 4, 1913 Anatol Kagan's career as an architect spanned over seven decades until his death on July 2, 2009. He was actively involved in the field of design, as well as a writer, translator, lecturer and political activist.  The house is an important work of its period demonstrating the Modernist architectural movement of Melbourne during the mid 20th Century, and in 2018 was added to the Victorian Heritage Register.  Kagan was also influenced by the works of his local contemporaries, Roy Grounds, Frederick Romberg and Robin Boyd.

Description
The house is  composed of protruding bays and timber mullioned window walls, shaded by deep eaves, stone and brick construction with steel supports. The upper level is extensively glazed, flooding the living areas with natural light. The house has a shallow butterfly roof, almost flat at the rear, sloping up to the front. The ground level includes only ancillary spaces and the entry foyer, with the living quarters and most of the bedrooms upstairs. Interiors of most of the upper-storey rooms contain original finishes and joinery, and some light fittings, with extensive bespoke built-in timber joinery and furniture, including upholstered finishes such as the in-built headboard in the master bedroom, and the living room sliding door.

Key influences
Kagan trained in Germany in the early 1930s when Modernism held sway, emigrating to Australia in 1939. The design elements of Australian architecture around the time of construction of the House at Caulfield.  The style of glazing is representative of the Modernist movement and follows a staggered rectangle pattern with a blue coloured fill on the lowest panes. The glazing style is attributed to Kenneth McDonald's house at Vermont.  Kagan worked with some of the prominent architectural practices of the 20th Century, which included Seabrook and Fildes, Joseph Plotel and with German architect Walter Gropius. The influence of the designs of these practices is aesthetically evident in Kagan's design for the House at Caulfield. Using materials consistently throughout the design such as brick, stone and concrete for the main structure, and using the motif of the flat roof were also popular of Australian architecture in the 1950s in which Kagan was directly influenced by the works of Roy Grounds, Fredrick Romberg and Robin Boyd. House at Caulfield is designed consistently with the style of Anatol Kagan's other projects around that time, however does not include a street facing balcony which is an element that many of Kagan's residential projects demonstrate.

References

External links
 RMIT Design Archives Journal Volume 1, Number 2, 2011
 Dictionary of Unsung Architects Anatol Kagan (1913-2009) - Built Heritage

Houses in Melbourne
Houses completed in 1956
1956 establishments in Australia
Buildings and structures in the City of Glen Eira
Heritage-listed buildings in Melbourne